Strange Journey Volume Three is a 2014 mixtape by American hip hop group CunninLynguists. It peaked at number 37 on Billboards Heatseekers Albums chart.

Track listing

The CD version and the vinyl version do not include "Hot".

Personnel
Credits adapted from the CD liner notes.
 Kno – production (except "The Format" and "Dying Breed"), additional programming (on "The Format" and "Dying Breed"), mixing, mastering
 RJD2 – production (on "The Format")
 Thomax – production (on "Dying Breed")
 DJ FlipFlop – turntables (on "South California" and "The Format")
 C. Bryan – additional vocals (on "Innerspace")
 Amond "A.J." Jackson – additional engineering
 Mark Borders – additional engineering
 Lofidel – additional engineering
 Nino Moschella – additional engineering
 Chris Miscik – artwork
 Anthony Cole – graphic design

Charts

References

External links
 Strange Journey Volume Three at Bandcamp
 

2014 mixtape albums
CunninLynguists albums
Hip hop compilation albums
Sequel albums